A League of Their Own is a 1992 American film by Penny Marshall.

A League of Their Own may also refer to:

 A League of Their Own (British game show), a British television game show
 A League of Their Own (Australian game show), an Australian version of the above show
 A League of Their Own (1993 TV series), an American television series based on the film
 A League of Their Own (2022 TV series), an American television series based on the film
 "A League of Their Own", an episode of the American comedy series Ugly Betty
 "A League of Their Own", a two-part episode of Static Shock